The sinking of the Titanic in 1912 shocked the world and has attracted controversy, resulting in a number of conspiracy theories regarding the disaster.

One such hypothesis is that the sunken ship was actually the Titanics near-identical sister-ship  Olympic, which was the subject of a large insurance claim, and that the two vessels were secretly swapped prior to the voyage.

Investigation results

The Titanic collided with an iceberg, damaging the hull's plates below the waterline on the starboard side, causing the front compartments to flood. The ship then sank two hours and forty minutes later, with approximately 1,500 fatalities as a result of drowning or hypothermia.

Olympic exchange hypothesis
One of the controversial and elaborate theories surrounding the sinking of the Titanic was advanced by Robin Gardiner in his book, Titanic: The Ship That Never Sank? Gardiner draws on several events and coincidences that occurred in the months, days, and hours leading up to the sinking of the Titanic, and concludes that the ship that sank was in fact Titanics sister ship , disguised as Titanic, as an insurance scam by its owners, the International Mercantile Marine Group, controlled by American financier J.P. Morgan that had acquired the White Star Line in 1902.

Researchers Bruce Beveridge and Steve Hall took issue with many of Gardiner's claims in their book, Olympic and Titanic: The Truth Behind the Conspiracy. Author Mark Chirnside has also raised serious questions about the switch theory. British historian Gareth Russell, for his part, calls the theory "so painfully ridiculous that one can only lament the thousands of trees which lost their lives to provide the paper on which it has been articulated." He notes that, "since the sister ships had significant interior architectural and design differences, switching them secretly in a week would be nearly impossible from a practical standpoint. A switch would also not be economically worthwhile, since the ship's owners could have simply damaged the ship while docked (for instance, by setting a fire) and collected the insurance money from that "accident," which "would have been far less severe, and infinitely less stupid, than sailing her out into the middle of the Atlantic with thousands of people, and their luggage, on board, and ramming her into an iceberg."

Deliberately sunk
Some theorists believe that the Titanic was sunk on purpose to eliminate opposition to the creation of the Federal Reserve Bank. Some of the wealthiest men in the world were aboard the Titanic for her maiden voyage, several of whom, including John Jacob Astor IV, Benjamin Guggenheim, and Isidor Straus, were allegedly opposed to the creation of a U.S. central bank. No evidence of their opposition to Morgan's centralized banking ideas has been found –– Astor and Guggenheim never spoke publicly on the subject, Straus spoke in favor of the concept. All three men died during the sinking. Conspiracy theorists suggest that J.P. Morgan, the 74 year-old financier who set up the investment banking firm that still bears his name, arranged to have the men board the ship and then sunk it to eliminate them. Morgan, nicknamed the "Napoleon of Wall Street", had helped create General Electric, U.S. Steel, and International Harvester, and was credited with almost single-handedly saving the U.S. banking system during the Panic of 1907. Morgan did have a hand in the creation of the Federal Reserve, and owned the International Mercantile Marine, which owned the White Star Line, and thus the Titanic.

Morgan, who had attended the Titanic launching in 1911, had booked a personal suite aboard the ship with his own private promenade deck and a bath equipped with specially designed cigar holders. He was reportedly booked on the ship's maiden voyage but instead cancelled the trip and remained at the French resort of Aix-les-Bains to enjoy his morning massages and sulfur baths. His allegedly last-minute cancellation has fuelled speculation among conspiracy theorists that he knew of the ship's fate. This theory has been refuted by Titanic experts George Behe, Don Lynch, and Ray Lepien who have each provided alternate, more widely-accepted theories as to why Morgan chose to cancel his trip on the Titanic.

Closed watertight doors
Another theory involves Titanics watertight doors. This theory suggests that if these doors had been opened, the Titanic would have settled on an even keel and therefore, perhaps, remained afloat long enough for rescue ships to arrive. However, this theory has been rebutted for two reasons: first, the first four compartments were naturally watertight, thus it was impossible to lower the concentration of water in the bow significantly. Second, Bedford and Hacket have shown by calculations that any significant amount of water aft of boiler room No. 4 would have resulted in capsizing of the Titanic, which would have occurred about 30 minutes earlier than the actual time of sinking. Additionally, the lighting would have been lost about 70 minutes after the collision due to the flooding of the boiler rooms. Bedford and Hacket also analyzed the hypothetical case that there were no bulkheads at all. Then, the vessel would have capsized about 70 minutes before the actual time of sinking and lighting would have been lost about 40 minutes after the collision.

Later, in a 1998 documentary titled Titanic: Secrets Revealed, the Discovery Channel ran model simulations which also rebutted this theory. The simulations indicated that opening Titanics watertight doors would have caused the ship to capsize earlier than it actually sank by more than one half-hour, supporting the findings of Bedford and Hacket.

Expansion joints hypothesis

Titanic researchers continued to debate the causes and mechanics of the ships breakup. According to his book, A Night to Remember, Walter Lord described Titanic as assuming an "absolutely perpendicular" position shortly before its final plunge. This view remained largely unchallenged even after the wreck was discovered by Robert Ballard in 1985, which confirmed that Titanic had broken in two pieces at or near the surface; paintings by noted marine artist Ken Marschall and as imagined onscreen in James Cameron's film Titanic, both depicted the ship attaining a steep angle prior to the breakup. Most researchers acknowledged that Titanics aft expansion joint—designed to allow for flexing of the hull in a seaway—played little to no role in the ship's breakup, though debate continued as to whether the ship had broken from the top downwards or from the bottom upwards.
 
In 2005, a History Channel expedition to the wreck site scrutinized two large sections of Titanics keel, which constituted the portion of the ship's bottom from immediately below the site of the break. With assistance from naval architect Roger Long, the team analysed the wreckage and developed a new break-up scenario which was publicised in the television documentary Titanic's Final Moments: Missing Pieces in 2006. One hallmark of this new theory was the claim that Titanics angle at the time of the breakup was far less than had been commonly assumed—according to Long, no greater than 11°.
 
Long also suspected that Titanics breakup may have begun with the premature failure of the ship's aft expansion joint, and ultimately exacerbated the loss of life by causing Titanic to sink faster than anticipated. In 2006, the History Channel sponsored dives on Titanics newer sister ship, which verified that the design of Britannics expansion joints was superior to that incorporated in the Titanic. To further explore Long's theory, the History Channel commissioned a new computer simulation by JMS Engineering. The simulation, whose results were featured in the 2007 documentary Titanic's Achilles Heel, partially refuted Long's suspicions by demonstrating that Titanics expansion joints were strong enough to deal with any and all stresses the ship could reasonably be expected to encounter in service and, during the sinking, actually outperformed their design specifications. But, most important is that the expansion joints were part of the superstructure, which was situated above the strength deck (B-deck) and therefore above the top of the structural hull girder. Thus, the expansion joints had no meaning for the support of the hull. They played no role in the breaking of the hull. They simply opened up and parted as the hull flexed or broke beneath them.

Brad Matsen's 2008 book Titanic's Last Secrets endorses the expansion joint theory.

One common oversight is the fact that the collapse of the first funnel at a relatively shallow angle occurred when the forward expansion joint, over which several funnels stays crossed, opened as the hull was beginning to stress. The opening of the joint stretched and snapped the stays. The forward momentum of the ship as she took a sudden lurch forwards and downwards sent the unsupported funnel toppling onto the starboard bridge wing.

One theory that would support the fracturing of the hull is that the Titanic partly grounded on the shelf of ice below the waterline as she collided with the iceberg, perhaps damaging the keel and underbelly. Later during the sinking, it was noticed that Boiler Room four flooded from below the floor grates rather than from over the top of the watertight bulkhead. This would be consistent with additional damage along the keel compromising the integrity of the hull.

Fire in coal bunker 
A fire began in one of Titanic coal bunkers approximately 10 days prior to the ship's departure, and continued to burn for several days into the voyage. Fires occurred frequently on board steamships due to spontaneous combustion of the coal. The fires had to be extinguished with fire hoses, by moving the coal on top to another bunker and by removing the burning coal and feeding it into the furnace. This event has led some authors to theorize that the fire exacerbated the effects of the iceberg collision, by reducing the structural integrity of the hull and a critical bulkhead.

In 2011 David J H Smith posited this idea in his book The Titanic's Mummy which looked at the event in a docudrama style. It was stated that the bunker fire was at the heart of the eventual disaster, claiming that decisions made because of the blaze led it to a collision course with the iceberg. The book also looks at the fire's physical effect on the ship which claims it weakened the area of impact.

Senan Molony has suggested that attempts to extinguish the fire – by shoveling burning coals into the engine furnaces – may have been the primary reason for the Titanic steaming at full speed prior to the collision, despite ice warnings. Most experts disagree. Samuel Halpern has concluded that "the bunker fire would not have weakened the watertight bulkhead sufficiently to cause it to collapse." Also, it has been alternatively suggested that the coal bunker fire actually helped Titanic to last longer during the sinking and prevented the ship from rolling over to starboard after the impact, due to the subtle port list created by the moving of coal inside the ship prior to the encounter with the iceberg. Some of these foremost Titanic experts have published a detailed rebuttal of Molony's claims.

See also
Encyclopedia Titanica
Legends and myths regarding RMS Titanic

References

Bibliography

External links 
 Was there a fire aboard Titanic?, CBC News

 Science and technology-related conspiracy theories
Pseudohistory
Alternative theories
 Death conspiracy theories
Pseudoscience